Jorge Garcia (born April 28, 1973) is an American actor and comedian. He first came to public attention with his performance as Hector Lopez on the television show Becker, but subsequently became best known for his portrayal of Hugo "Hurley" Reyes in the television series Lost from 2004 to 2010. He starred in the Fox television series Alcatraz and played a minor character on ABC's Once Upon a Time. He starred as Jerry Ortega on Hawaii Five-0 and can be seen in the Netflix original movie The Ridiculous 6. Garcia also appeared on the cover of Weezer's 2010 album Hurley in a close-up shot from a photo he took with vocalist Rivers Cuomo.

Early life and education
Garcia was born in Omaha, Nebraska. His mother, Dora Mesa, is a Cuban-born professor, and his father, Humberto Garcia, is a Chilean-born doctor. He grew up in San Juan Capistrano in Orange County, California and went to San Clemente High School. He wrestled in high school, where he was given the nickname "Baby-Faced Killer".  As a senior, he was selected by the faculty as "Triton of the Year", the highest award given to a graduating senior.

Garcia graduated from the University of California Los Angeles (UCLA) in 1995 as a Communication Studies major.  He also studied acting at the Beverly Hills Playhouse acting school.

Career
Garcia spent six years working at Borders Books and Music while auditioning.  He was in a few commercials during that time.  He later said that his first taste of street recognition came from starring in a Jack in the Box commercial which was aired frequently on local television. 

Garcia was the first actor to be cast on Lost after the producers saw him on Curb Your Enthusiasm the night before casting began, and created the character of Hugo Reyes specifically for him.
Garcia appeared in the second episode of the eighth season of Celebrity Poker Showdown, where he lost to Michael Ian Black. He was a contestant on an episode of Russian Roulette on Game Show Network. He missed a question about the Boxer Rebellion of 1900 and fell through the trap door.

Garcia is an associate producer and star in the independent film When We Were Pirates, in which he plays Jerry, who along with a group of close friends, learns that his childhood love of playing pirates helps him overcome some of the difficulties he faces later in life. He is seen singing in the studio for the upcoming project on an officially released YouTube clip.

During Losts run, Garcia wrote a blog about the show called Dispatches from the Island. He also hosted a weekly podcast, Geronimo Jack's Beard, in which he discussed the script of Season 6.

Garcia is also featured on the front cover of Weezer's album Hurley, released on September 10, 2010. The album is named after his character from Lost. He performed as a guest vocalist at several Weezer concerts in 2010.

On November 21, 2010, Entertainment Weekly announced that Garcia was cast in the upcoming U.S. television series Alcatraz. On November 22, 2010, Garcia made a guest appearance on How I Met Your Mothers episode "Blitzgiving". In the episode, references are made to Garcia's time on Lost.

In 2011, Garcia appeared as a recurring character in Mr. Sunshine, portraying a caretaker at the Sunshine Center. Starting in January 2012, Garcia portrayed Dr. Diego Soto, an Alcatraz expert, in the Fox series Alcatraz.  The show was a mid-season replacement for Fox's Terra Nova. The series was officially cancelled by Fox on May 9, 2012, due to dropping viewership throughout its run. Garcia appeared on The Nerdist podcast posted June 18, 2012.

After appearing as a guest star in several season 4 episodes of Hawaii Five-0, Garcia, who plays the character of Jerry Ortega, was promoted to a series regular starting with season five.

In 2015, he joined the cast of The Healer starring with British actor Oliver Jackson-Cohen, Camilla Luddington and Jonathan Pryce.

Garcia launched a biweekly podcast with co-host Ralph Apel dedicated to kaiju films titled Kaiju Podcast on November 14, 2016.

In 2022, Garcia competed in season seven of The Masked Singer as "Cyclops" of Team Bad. He was eliminated alongside Jordan Mailata as "Thingamabob" of Team Cuddly.

Filmography

References

External links

1973 births
20th-century American male actors
21st-century American male actors
American bloggers
American male film actors
American male bloggers
American male television actors
American male voice actors
American people of Chilean descent
American people of Cuban descent
American podcasters
Hispanic and Latino American male actors
Living people
Male actors from California
Male actors from Nebraska
Male actors from Omaha, Nebraska
People from San Clemente, California
University of California, Los Angeles alumni